Apocerea is a genus of moths in the subfamily Arctiinae described by Harrison Gray Dyar Jr. in 1905. It contains the species Apocerea sobria, described by William Schaus in 1905, which is found in French Guiana.

References

Arctiidae genus list at Butterflies and Moths of the World of the Natural History Museum

Arctiinae
Monotypic moth genera
Moths of South America